HD 61005, also known as HIP 36948, is a young star located in the southern constellation Puppis, the poop deck. It has an apparent magnitude of 8.22, making it readily visible in binoculars, but not to the naked eye.

Characteristics
HD 61005 has a stellar classification of G8 Vk, indicating that it is a yellow dwarf with interstellar absorption features in its spectrum. However, it is younger than the Sun at an age of 30 million years. Other studies place it an older age, ranging from 135 million years to 2 billion years. Nevertheless, the star retains a protoplanetary disk - the accumulation of the gas-dust matter, forming a planetary system. HD 61005 is located in the Local Bubble, a region with a low concentration of dust clouds. It is suspected to be a member of the Argus association.

It has 96% the mass of the Sun and 81% of its solar radius.

Protoplanetary disk
In 2007, astronomer Dean C. Hines and colleagues announced the discovery of a protoplanetary disk around HD 61005. The disk has an unusual shape, which may be due to the influence of the dense regions of the interstellar medium. The researchers also suggest that the passage through these areas can affect the atmosphere of planets that form. The disc diameter and morphologically resembles a butterfly shape, so it was appropriate for the informal name.  Analysis of the data did not confirm the presence of planets in the system.

References

G-type main-sequence stars
Puppis
061005
36948
BD+31 4778
Circumstellar disks